Thubten Samphel (2 November 1956 – 4 June 2022) was a Tibetan writer, journalist, and government official. He worked as a secretary in the Ministry of Foreign Affairs and was a spokesperson of the Central Tibetan Administration, based in Dharamshala. He also worked for the administration's think tank, Tibet Policy Institute.

Biography

Family
Born in Lhasa in 1956, Samphel was the son of parents who worked as servants to the mother of the 14th Dalai Lama, Diki Tsering.

Exile in India
Three years after the 1959 Tibetan uprising, Samphel left Tibet with his older brother. They arrived in Tingri before crossing the Chinese-Nepalese border into the Solukhumbu District.

Studies
Tsering Dolma, older sister of the 14th Dalai Lama, sent Samphel to school at the Tibetan Children's Villages before he joined Dr. Graham's Homes, a missionary school in Kalimpong. After his secondary studies, he attended St. Stephen's College, Delhi and Delhi University, where he earned a bachelor's and a master's degree in history.

Administrative career
In 1980, Samphel became an official within the Tibetan government-in-exile. He was among the first group of Tibetan Fulbright Scholars to study in the United States, where he earned a degree in journalism from Columbia University. From 1999 to 2012, he was secretary of the Ministry of Foreign Affairs and a spokesperson of the Central Tibetan Administration. In 2012, he became director of the Tibet Policy Institute. In November 2018, he retired from the Central Tibetan Administration.

Writer
Samphel wrote articles for numerous Tibetan, Indian, and foreign newspapers. He authored the novel Falling through the roof.

Death
Thubten Samphel died in Bylakuppe on 4 June 2022.

Publications
Les dalaï-lamas du Tibet (2001)
Falling through the Roof (2008)
Tibet : from Tranquillity to Turmoil (2008)
Tibet: Reports from Exile (2019)
 Copper Mountain (2022)

References

1956 births
2022 deaths
Tibetan writers
Tibetan journalists
People from Lhasa